Copa de la España Libre (Free Spain Cup), also referred to as the Copa de la España Libre – Trofeo Presidente de la República,  was a football competition played in the Republican area of Spain during the Spanish Civil War. The competition, played out in June and July 1937, was won by Levante FC.

History
It was originally intended that the top four teams from the Mediterranean League would enter the competition, but FC Barcelona opted instead to tour Mexico and the United States. As a result,  Levante FC, who had finished fifth in the league, took their place. The other three teams to enter were Valencia CF, CE Espanyol and Girona FC.  The first stage of the competition was played as a mini-league with the top two teams, Levante FC and Valencia FC, then qualifying for the final.

For seventy years Levante UD unsuccessfully claimed this competition was the equivalent the Copa del Rey. Although in 2007 the Congress of Deputies urged Royal Spanish Football Federation to recognise it as a Copa del Rey win for Levante UD, the governing body of Spanish football has not taken a decision yet.

Group Stage Table

Final

References

Copa
Football in the Valencian Community
Defunct football competitions in Spain
Football in Catalonia
Wartime association football
Spanish Civil War
History of football in Spain
Copa del Rey